Aminata Sow Fall (born 27 April 1941) is a Senegalese-born author. While her native language is Wolof, her books are written in French. She is considered "the first published woman novelist from francophone Black Africa".

Life
She was born in Saint-Louis, Senegal, where she grew up before moving to Dakar to finish her secondary schooling. After this, she did a degree in Modern Languages at the Sorbonne in Paris, France and became a teacher upon returning to Senegal.
She was a member of the Commission for Educational Reform responsible for the introduction of African literature into the French syllabus in Senegal, before becoming director of La Propriété littéraire (The Literary Property) in Dakar (1979–88). She was the Director of the literature section of the Ministry of Culture then also became the Director of the Centre d'Etudes des Civilations, a centre which researches Senegal's culture and oral literatures. Her works are often concerned with social issues, power and corruption, and with her experience in both Paris and Senegal, she explores the many of traditions and cultures within both of these societies.

She was appointed the first woman president of Senegal's Writer's Association in 1985.
Two years later, in 1987, she founded the 'Centre Africain d'Animation et d'Echanges Culturels', an organisation which promotes young writers through literature festivals, seminars and competitions, publishing them in the affiliated publishing house Éditions Khoudia which she founded in 1990. 
She is a member of the Ordre de Mérite.
Senegal's Directorate of Books and Reading named their 'Aminata Sow Fall Prize for Creativity' after her, a manuscript prize which they set up in conjunction with the International Book Fair to support young literary creators.
She played the part of Aunt Oumy in Djibril Diop Mambéty's classic 1973 road movie Touki Bouki.

Growing up in an education system designed and run by the French, Sow Fall was only exposed to a few names from African literature growing up, since this was a system which prioritised Western names and titles. With this experience of living and being educated in both non-Western Senegal and Western France, Sow Fall separated herself from other African writers, who, she expresses, often feel that they must situate themselves in relation to the West. She feels that African literature would gain from a sense of self-discovery through writing, an common experience for Western authors, and from leaving behind the self-consciousness with which she feels many African authors have historically carried into their literature.

Awards
 1980 - Grand prix littéraire d'Afrique noire for La Grève des bàttu.
 1982 - Prix International Alioune Diop for L'Appel des arènes.
 1997 - honorary doctorate from Mount Holyoke College, South Hadley, Massachusetts.

Writing

Her books include:
Le Revenant, Nouvelles éditions africaines, 1976. .
L'empire du mensonge (2018). ISBN 979-1035600068
Femmes d'Afrique (2001). ISBN 9782842612979
La Grève des bàttu (1979); Nouvelles éditions africaines, 1980; Serpent à plumes (paperback 2001), 
The Beggars' Strike, trans. Dorothy Blair, Longman (1986), 
L'Appel des arènes (The Call of the Arena) (1982); Nouvelles éditions africaines, 1993. .
Ex-père de la nation: roman, Paris: L'Harmattan, 1987. .
Douceurs du bercail, Nouvelles Editions ivoiriennes, 1998. .
Le jujubier du patriarche: roman, Serpent à Plumes, 1998
Sur le flanc gauche du Belem. Arles: Actes Sud, 2002. .
Un grain de vie et d'espérance. Paris: Françoise Truffaut Editions, 2002. .

The film Battu (2000) by director Cheick Oumar Sissoko is based on her novel La Grève des bàttu.

References

Further reading
 Simon Gikandi, Encyclopedia of African Literature, Routledge (2002), pp. 518–9. 
 Médoune Guèye, Aminata Sow Fall: Oralité et société dans l'oeuvre romanesque, Editions L'Harmattan (2005). 
 

Ada Uzoamaka Azodo, Emerging Perspectives on Aminata Sow Fall: The Real and the Imaginary in her Novels, Africa World Press, 2007. .
  
  Sylvester N. Mutunda, 'Descriptions of masculinity in African women's creative writing', Lewiston, Edwin Mellen Press, 2015.
 
 
 Anna-Leena Toivanen, 'Failing cosmopolitanism: aborted transnational journeys in novels by Monique Ilboudo, Sefi Atta and Aminata Sow Fall', Journal of postcolonial writing, 2016.
 Guèye, Médoune, 'Criticism, Écriture, and Orality in the African Novel: Oral Discourse in Aminata Sow Fall's Work', Research in African literatures, 2014. 
 Dieng, Mamadou, 'Kinship and Friendship in Hardship: A Comparative Analysis of Aminata Sow Fall's Le Revenant and John Francis Scott Fitzgerald's The Great Gatsby', The Jounrnal of Pan African studies, 2016. 
 
 

1941 births
Living people
People from Saint-Louis, Senegal
Senegalese writers in French
Senegalese novelists
Senegalese women novelists
20th-century women writers
20th-century novelists
21st-century women writers
21st-century novelists
Recipients of orders, decorations, and medals of Senegal